Preecha Chanapai also known as Lek Carabao is a Thai musician and singer, who is the member of Carabao, a famous and popular Thai rock and Phleng phuea chiwit (Thai protest song) band.

Biography and career

Preecha (nicknamed: Lek; เล็ก) was born in Bangkok on April 18, 1955. He practiced playing guitar at the age of 13 with his brother teaching. He studied at the Uthenthawai School of Mechanics (currently Rajamangala University of Technology Tawan-ok: Uthenthawai Campus), which the same institution as Yuenyong Opakul (Aed Carabao), but they are not known while studying.

When he graduated, he joined a guitarist with The President, a disco band play regularly at pubs or restaurants in hotels around Bangkok, so it is famous among musicians. He plays the guitar very well.

He joined Carabao in the second album release in 1982, Pae Khaai Khuat (แป๊ะขายขวด; lit: "The Old Bottle Collector") from the persuasion of Aed Carabao as the guitarist and singer since then.

In 2003, he starred in the Fan Chan (แฟนฉัน; lit: "My Girlfriend") as the father of the female lead role character, who has a career as a barber. This film is the most popular and the highest-grossing movie of the year in Thailand.

For personal life, he married and had two sons nicknames Tod and Fab. He pinned guitar pick on the right fingernail forever with glue. In addition to the guitar, he can also play Thai instrument Saw u (ซออู้) as well as Chinese instrument Guzheng.  In addition to being a musician he also produced Carabao branded acoustic guitar as well. Since he was older he does not eat meat except fish. He likes to collect bottles of shampoo and liquid soap of various hotels he stay during on the road.

He is the inspirational and favorite musician of another Thai famous musician, Pongsit Kamphee.

In the film Young Bao The Movie released in 2013 with a story about Carabao in the beginning. His character is represented by Arak "Pe Slur
" Amornsupasiri.

See also
Phleng phuea chiwit
Carabao
Aed Carabao

References

External links
Official Facebook 

1955 births
Living people
Preecha Chanapai
Preecha Chanapai
Preecha Chanapai
Preecha Chanapai
Preecha Chanapai
Preecha Chanapai